Santhosh Keezhattoor is an Indian film & theatre actor. He had acted in many leading and supportive roles. He won  acclaim though doing character roles. Before entering into the film industry, he was working as a theatre artist. and a programme producer. He started his career in Taliparmba a town in Kannur district Kerala

Early life
Santhosh was initiated to the world of drama at the age of five.  He became part of Kannur's professional theatre group Sangha Chethana the age of sixteen. He had played major roles in dramas like Sakhavu, Pazhassi Raja, Soorya Pett, Swathanthryathinte Murivukal, Freedom Road, Samaya theeram, Marupuram and Che Guevera. He played the lead role for the first time in Beegum Mary Biswas, a drama promoted by Theatre Vision Kerala. He was actively  involved in Kozhikode Chiranthana's Kodeeswaran and Padanilam, KPAC's Innalekalile Aakasam, Thiruvananthapuram Aksharakala's Kottayath Thampuran, Kollam Viswabhavana's Avathara Purushan and Alapuzha Sangha Chithra's Karashaka Rajavu. Santhosh had also directed many school and campus theatre ventures.

Apart as Film Actor
Santhosh was one of the best drama trainer across schools and colleges. He had won wide acclaim for his solo drama that narrates the life of Ochira Velu asan.

Solo Play
Among the theatre ventures of Santhosh, Pen Nadan (പെൺ നടൻ) won large scale critical acclaim.
Pen Nadan is his theatre interpretation of the life and times of Ochira Sivaprasad C Velukutti alias Velu Kutti Asan, who don many remarkable women characters in the evolving years of Malayalam theatre. Velukutti had metamorphosed as many women characters of legendary poet Kumaran Asan on stage and they include Vasavadatta, Nalini, Seetha, Leela and Mathangi.

Filmography

All films are in Malayalam language unless otherwise noted.

Television

Short films

Theatre

Awards

References

External links
 

Male actors from Kerala
People from Kannur district
Living people
Indian male film actors
21st-century Indian male actors
Indian male voice actors
Male actors in Malayalam cinema
1976 births
Indian male television actors
Male actors in Malayalam television